Jocoaitique is a municipality in the Morazán department of El Salvador.

Sports
The local football club is named C.D. Atlético Juvenil and it currently plays in the Salvadoran Third Division.

Municipalities of the Morazán Department